Alan John Bayard Wace (13 July 1879 – 9 November 1957) was an English archaeologist.

Biography
Wace was educated at Shrewsbury School and Pembroke College, Cambridge. He was director of the British School at Athens (1914–1923), Deputy Keeper in the Department of Textiles in the Victoria and Albert Museum (1924–1934), the second Laurence Professor of Classical Archaeology at University of Cambridge (1934–1944) and professor at the Farouk I University in Egypt (1943–1952).

Among Wace's field projects were those at Sparta, Mycenae, Troy, Thessaly, Corinth, and Alexandria. Along with Carl Blegen, Wace carried out important work on the decipherment of Linear B tablets. Elizabeth (Lisa) Bayard French, was Wace's daughter.

Works
Prehistoric Thessaly (1912). 
The nomads of the Balkans : an account of life and customs among the Vlachs of northern Pindus (1913).
Excavations at Mycenae (1923).
Chamber tombs at Mycenae (1932).
The Sarcophagus of Alexander the Great in Farouk University Bulletin of the Faculty of Arts, Volume IV (1948).
Mycenae, an Archaeological History and Guide (1949). 
A Companion to Homer (1962).
The Marlborough Tapestries at Blenheim Palace and their Relation to Other Military Tapestries of the War of the Spanish Succession (reprinted 1968).

References

Obituaries
Carl Blegen, "Alan John Bayard Wace (1879–1957)", American Philosophical Society Yearbook (1958), 162–71.
Sinclair Hood, 'Alan John Bayard Wace', Gnomon 30 (1958), 158–9.
 Alan John Bayard Wace. The Times, 11 November 1957

External links

British archaeologists
English classical scholars
People educated at Shrewsbury School
Alumni of Pembroke College, Cambridge
1879 births
1957 deaths
Scholars of Mycenaean Greek
People from Cambridge
Laurence Professors of Classical Archaeology
Directors of the British School at Athens
People associated with the Victoria and Albert Museum
Archaeologists of the Bronze Age Aegean